James Barton Bowen (1815–1881) was Mayor of Madison, Wisconsin. He held the office from 1871 to 1872. He was also the first homeopathic physician in Dane County, and president of the Park Savings Bank.

His former home, now known as the James B. Bowen House, is listed on the National Register of Historic Places.

References

Mayors of Madison, Wisconsin
1815 births
1881 deaths
19th-century American politicians